Hold On is the debut studio album by American rock band Name Taken. The album was produced by Saosin guitarist Beau Burchell. The second track, "Hold on for Your Dearest Life", was subsequently collected on the Warped Tour 2005 Tour Compilation.

The lyrics of the fourth track "Panic", is the first appearance of the term Panic! at the Disco, later used as the namesake of the platinum-selling band.

Panic! at the discoSat back and took it so slow
Are you nervous? Are you shaking?

Reception

Hold On received mixed to favorable reviews from critics. AbsolutePunk founder Jason Tate gave the album a 91% rating, noting "The music beat pulses into your chest, your head expands and contracts with each riff and you can't help but let your head rock to the music." Punknews.org also praised the album in their review, noting "If there is a competition to see which of the two bands featured on last year's Bayside/Name Taken Split would produce a better follow-up full length album, consider Name Taken the winner." Allmusic gave the album a less favorable review, stating "For the album's duration, its Name Taken's adherence to formula and the glossy production of Beau Burchell -- not memorable hooks or unique dynamics -- that keep things together."

Track listing

Personnel

Name Taken
Chad Atkinson – Lead vocals, bass guitar
Blake Means – Guitar
Ryan Edwards – Guitar 
Danny Valencia – Drums, percussion

Artwork
Creative Direction - Amy Fleisher Madden
Sergie Loobkoff – Design
RJ Shaughnessy – Photography

Production
Beau Burchell – Producer, engineer, mixing
Shawn Sullivan – Mastering
Rory Phillips – Pre-Production, Vocal Producer

Managerial
One Moment Management – Lance Brown

References

Name Taken albums
2004 debut albums
Fiddler Records albums
Albums produced by Beau Burchell